Sean Dollman (born December 8, 1968, in Cape Town, Western Cape, South Africa) is a retired Irish long-distance runner.  He represented Ireland in two Olympics, running the 10,000 metres in 1992 and 1996.  He was the 1991 NCAA Cross Country Champion while representing Western Kentucky University and was the sixth placer finisher the year before.

References

Living people
1968 births
Irish male long-distance runners
Athletes (track and field) at the 1992 Summer Olympics
Athletes (track and field) at the 1996 Summer Olympics
Olympic athletes of Ireland